Money is a 1921 British silent comedy film directed by Duncan McRae and starring Henry Ainley, Faith Bevan and Margot Drake. It is an adaptation of the 1840 comic play Money by Edward Bulwer-Lytton.

Cast
 Henry Ainley ...  Alfred Evelyn 
 Faith Bevan ...  Georgina Vesey 
 Margot Drake ...  Clare Douglas 
 Sam Wilkinson ...  Sir Frederick Blount 
 James Lindsay ...  Captain Smooth 
 Olaf Hytten ...  Henry Graves 
 Sidney Paxton ...  Sir John Vesey 
 Ethel Newman ...  Lady Franklyn 
 Adelaide Grace ...  Nanny

References

External links

1921 films
1921 comedy films
British comedy films
British films based on plays
Films based on works by Edward Bulwer-Lytton
Ideal Film Company films
British black-and-white films
British silent feature films
1920s English-language films
1920s British films
Silent comedy films